The Diocesan Shrine and Parish of the Our Lady of the Pillar - Imus Cathedral, commonly known as the Imus Cathedral, is a Roman Catholic cathedral church in the city of Imus, in the province of Cavite, Philippines. The city, which is the capital of the province, also serves as the seat of the bishop of the Diocese of Imus, the diocese that has jurisdiction over the entire Civil Province of Cavite.

Enshrined inside the cathedral is the original, miraculous and canonically crowned image of Nuestra Senora del Pilar de Imus (Our Lady of the Pillar). The said title of the Blessed Virgin Mary serves as the titular patroness of the Diocese of Imus, Province of Cavite, as implied by then pope, now a saint, John XXIII. John the Baptist is also considered the secondary patron saint of the city. The current parish priest and rector of the cathedral is Reuel Castañeda, vicar general of the diocese.

The church itself features the longest Holy Week procession in the province of Cavite, with at least 70 floats and the country's 5th longest overall (the other four being the St Augustine Parish, Baliuag, and San Isidro Labrador, Pulilan, both located in the province of Bulacan, with at least 110 floats per parish, The Our Lady Of the Abandoned in Marikina, with 82 floats, and The Our Lady of Aranzazu San Mateo, Rizal with 76 floats). Currently, the cathedral is being elevated into Cathedral Shrine.

History

Establishment
In 1616, the Augustinian Recollects arrived in Imus and established a convent.  The parish of Imus started as a chapel-of-ease in Brgy. Toclong, a sub-parish (visita) of Cavite Viejo (now Kawit, Cavite).  Recollect Father Pedro de San Buenaventura petitioned the government to convert Imus into an independent municipality in 1774.  Imus, though, did not become a separate town and parish until October 3, 1795.  Its poblacion (town center) and a provisional church was first established in an area currently known as Brgy. Bayan Luma (Tagalog for 'Old Town').  The parish was under the order of the Augustinian Recollects with Francisco de Santiago, O.A.R., its first assigned priest.

Construction of the present church
During the leadership of Fr. Nicolas Becerra, who served from 1821 to 1840, he advocated the move of the town center to Brgy. Balangon, its present location.  The construction of the parish church of Imus on the new location was started in 1823 using forced labor.  The structure was made from stone and bricks.  Its facade was patterned after the fifth Manila Cathedral by Fr. Juan de Uguccioni, which existed from 1760 to 1852.

Hacienda de San Juan de Imus
The early fathers were preoccupied with not just religious matters but also of economic concerns. The friars gradually bought parcels of land while some of these lands were donated by rich families. The Recollects were the first ones to buy parcels of land beginning in 1666 and their haciendas came to being in 1812. These areas, comprising the Hacienda de San Juan de Imus or the Hacienda de Imus (Imus Estate), grew to include the whole towns of Imus, Dasmariñas, and Brgy. Binakayan in Kawit.  The estate house of the hacienda, or the house of the friars, was located along Imus River (at the present day Cuartel) at the southern end of the Bridge of Isabel II, a Spanish bridge built by the priest-engineers of the Recollects.  Citizens of Imus were required to pay rent to live and tilled the lands of Imus.

Secularization
The Hacienda de Imus was sold by the Recollect Corporation on March 31, 1894, to the Fomento de la Agricultura de Filipinas (Promotion of Agriculture in the Philippines), a corporation in Madrid, for 4,000,000 pesetas.  It was later sold to the British Manila Estates Company, which eventually sold it to the U.S. controlled Philippine government for $1,045,000 in U.S. currency for distribution to the Filipinos, to win their favor, and to pacify the revolutionaries.   The Church of Imus became secular in 1897.

Activities

Ministries 
 Parish Youth Ministry
 Ministry of Altar Servers
 Extraordinary Ministers of Holy Communion
 Lay Ministers of the Word
Our Lady of the Pillar Parish Music Ministry
includes: Tinig ng Katedral (est. 1980), Himig Batingaw (est. 1978), etc.
Ministry of Cantors

Radio Station 
89.5 FM frequency is used by the Parish to broadcast Parish activities such as the recitation of the Rosary for the traditional Good Friday procession. Daily Mass, Vigil and Sunday Masses, as well as Masses for holy days of obligation celebrated in the Cathedral are also transmitted live through the same frequency, broadcasting on a very low power output.

Diocese of Imus

By virtue of the Apostolic Constitution Christi fidelium promulgated by Pope John XXIII on November 25, 1961, Cavite was created a separate bishopric from Manila after more than three hundred years. On April 29, 1962, the Diocese of Imus was formally erected and established. The then parish church of Imus was chosen to become the cathedral of the diocese, the seat of the bishop of Cavite, with the Virgin Mary under her title Our Lady of the Pillar, its titular patroness.  The first leader of the diocese and bishop of Cavite is Artemio Casas, originally from Meycauayan, Bulacan.

Bishop of Imus
The current bishop of Imus is Reynaldo G. Evangelista, previously bishop of the Diocese of Boac and a native of Batangas, who was appointed by Pope Francis on April 8, 2013, his first pontifical appointment in the Philippines.  He replaced Bishop Luis Antonio Tagle (whose paternal ancestry is from Imus) after his installation as the Archbishop of Manila in December 12, 2011.  Evangelista was installed as the fifth bishop of Imus on June 5, 2013.

Historical marker
The cathedral was declared a structure of historical significance with the placing of a historical marker by then National Historical Institute of the Philippines on November 13, 2006.

Coronation of the patroness of the Diocese of Imus
The image of the patroness of the Imus Cathedral, Our Lady of the Pillar of Imus, was canonically crowned on December 3, 2012, by Luis Antonio Cardinal Tagle.  It was originally scheduled for November 26 but the elevation of Archbishop Tagle into a Cardinal by Pope Benedict XVI necessitated the move.

Vicariate of Our Lady of the Pillar
Vicariate of Our Lady of the Pillar (City of Imus)
Vicar Forane: Rev Fr. Benjamin Francisco

Parishes
Immaculate Heart of Mary Parish – Bucandala
Mary, Mother of God Parish – Malagasang II
Our Lady of Fatima Parish – Anabu I
Our Lady of Fatima Parish – Anabu II
Diocesan Shrine and Parish of Our Lady of the Pillar - Imus Cathedral – Poblacion (City Proper)
St. James the Greater Parish – Buhay na Tubig
St. Martha Parish – Greengate, Malagasang II
Holy Family Parish – Lancaster Estates
Our Mother of Perpetual Help - Dasmariñas Cavite DBB-1

Our Lady of the Pillar Parish

Chapels
 Mary, Mother of the Good Shepherd Chapel (Palico)
 Our Lady of the Pillar Chapel (Bayan Luma)
 St. Peregrine Chapel (Toclong)
 San Roque Chapel (Pag-asa)
 San Juan Bautista Chapel (Tanzang Luma)
 Our Lady of Fatima Chapel (Villa Leticia)
 Our Lady of the Miraculous Medal (Southern City Subdivision)
 San Lorenzo Ruiz Chapel (Narra Homes Subdivision)

References

External links

 Diocese of Imus videos
 Cavite historical sites

Roman Catholic cathedrals in the Philippines
Roman Catholic churches in Cavite
Buildings and structures in Imus
Roman Catholic churches completed in 1853
1853 establishments in the Philippines
Marked Historical Structures of the Philippines
Spanish Colonial architecture in the Philippines
Baroque Revival architecture
Baroque church buildings in the Philippines
19th-century Roman Catholic church buildings in the Philippines
Neoclassical church buildings in the Philippines
Churches in the Roman Catholic Diocese of Imus